Barrow Sixth Form College, part of Furness College, is in the outskirts of Barrow-in-Furness, Cumbria, England. Barrow Sixth Form College was established in 1979 to fulfil the role of the main A level provider in Barrow following the merger of the two Barrow Grammar Schools and their change to deliver education to only 11 to 16 year-olds. It is the only sixth form college in Cumbria. A levels and Cambridge Technical qualifications are taught in buildings that have been specially designed for students over the age of sixteen. It includes facilities for physically disabled students and is a satellite campus for Beaumont. The college primarily educates students within the age range of 16–18 years, as well as courses for adult learners.

In August 2016, the college gained chartered college status. This membership is awarded to the higher performing further education colleges and training providers in the UK. The college is also a member of the National Skills Academy for Nuclear.

Profile
As part of Furness College, the college is the largest provider of education and training in south Cumbria offering a wide range of A levels and technical/professional courses to its students. The college works closely with its local community providing a wide range of part-time and full-time courses and links closely to the courses offered at the Channelside campus.

The college has over 1400 students aged 16–18, of which over 500 study at the Rating Lane campus.

Campus

The Rating Lane campus is located at the north end of Rating Lane in Barrow-in-Furness. Nearby sites include Furness Abbey, Furness General Hospital, Chetwynde School, St. Bernard's Catholic High School and Abbey Road (the town's main central road network).

The campus was purpose built to replace existing school sixth forms in the town and it opened its doors in 1979. Plans to rebuild the campus in 2010 did not come to fruition due to the withdrawal of national college capital funding by the Learning and Skills Council (LSC). The campus has received substantial investment since the college's merger to fund, for example, upgrades to the fabric of the building, up-to-date computer equipment and a new IT network infrastructure, and cosmetic improvements around the campus. As part of the merger, the college committed to continue this investment to upgrade learning facilities.
The Rating Lane campus is one of two of Furness College's campuses, the other being Channelside in Barrow which is located approximately 3 miles away in the centre of the town.

Merger

On 1 August 2016, Barrow Sixth Form College underwent a 'type B'  merger with Furness College. The Sixth Form College received a financial notice to improve in January 2016 from the Education Funding Agency and was deemed no longer to be financially viable due to its inadequate financial health. As a result, merger discussions between the two colleges continued and on 1 August 2016, the corporation of Barrow Sixth Form College was dissolved and its assets and liabilities transferred to Furness College.

The college will continue to operate on both campuses, which are approximately three miles apart, retaining both the Furness College and Sixth Form College brands. Both A level and technical/professional courses will continue, with further expansion of the curriculum planned for future years where there may be opportunities for students to study a 'blended' curriculum offer. A level provision is predominantly offered at the college's Rating Lane campus with technical and professional qualifications mainly delivered at the Channelside campus.

Courses
Barrow Sixth Form College offers a wide range of A level courses which are predominantly studied on a full-time basis. Subject areas include:
 Sciences
 English
 Mathematics
 Humanities
 Creative and performing arts
 Modern languages
 Social sciences
 Health studies
 Sport
 Computer Science

As part of Furness College, the following courses are also offered:
 Full- and part-time courses - the college runs a large range of technical and professional courses for young people and adults, including T levels from 2021.
 Business Development - the college works with the local business community to provide bespoke training courses.
 School Leavers - a wide range of full-time courses are available from Art & Design through to Engineering, Health & Social Care, Sport and lots more.
 Apprenticeships - Furness College currently trains over 1000 apprentices and works with over 400 employers.
 Higher Education - from foundation degrees to master's degrees in a range of subject areas.

Ofsted Inspection
In March 2019, the college underwent a full Ofsted inspection which was its first Ofsted inspection since the merger between Furness College and Barrow Sixth Form College in August 2016. Inspectors judged the College to be a good (grade 2) college with good provision in all main judgement areas.

Student Union
The Furness College Students' Union is affiliated to the National Union of Students, and students of all Furness College campuses are entitled to membership. The college also offers extensive academic and pastoral support to all its students.

Leadership and Management
The College is led by the senior leadership team under the direction and scrutiny of the Board of the Corporation which is also responsible for overseeing the strategic direction of the college. Jan Fielding is the current Chair of Governors and Andrew Wren is the Principal and Chief Executive of Furness College, including Barrow Sixth Form College.

Notable alumni
 Steve Dixon - Newsreader (Weekend anchor on Sky News)
 Ade Gardner - Rugby league player (St. Helens and Great Britain)
 Karen Taylor - Comedian (finalist in the Daily Telegraph Open Mic Award, and has own sketch)
 Cat Smith - MP for Lancaster and Fleetwood
 Liam Livingstone - Professional cricketer for Lancashire CCC

References

External links
 

Education in Barrow-in-Furness
Buildings and structures in Barrow-in-Furness
Further education colleges in Cumbria
Educational institutions established in 1979
1979 establishments in England